Jiřina Třebická (1 November 1930 – 23 January 2005) was a Czech dancer and theatre and film actress.

Career
Her artistic career began first as a dancer in regional theaters. Since 1947, she worked in urban theatres in Most and České Budějovice and then moved to Ostrava where she worked since 1953 in a Dramatical ensemble of Petr Bezruč. Remained there until 1965 when, together with actor and director Jan Kačer and other colleagues stood before the founding of The Drama Club, where she was engaged in constant until 1993, featured a guest here still in 2000.

Filmography

External links

 Czechoslovak Movie Database
Obituary on iDnes.cz
Blooming lilies of the valley (in Czech)
Movie Database

References
"Passages from Czech "Magazine for Study of Scenic Creativity" by Honsová Petra

|
Czech stage actresses
Czech female dancers
Actresses from Prague
1930 births
2005 deaths
Czech film actresses